The following are lists which pertain to incidents of civil unrest and political violence in the United States sorted alphabetically by city.

Baltimore, Maryland - List of incidents of civil unrest in Baltimore
Cincinnati, Ohio - Cincinnati riots
Chicago, Illinois - List of incidents of civil unrest in Chicago
Eugene, Oregon - List of incidents of civil unrest in Eugene
Omaha, Nebraska - List of riots and civil unrest in Omaha, Nebraska
Minneapolis–Saint Paul - List of incidents of civil unrest in Minneapolis–Saint Paul
New York City, New York - List of incidents of civil unrest in New York City
Washington, D.C. - List of incidents of political violence in Washington, D.C.

See also
 List of incidents of civil unrest in the United States
 List of riots (notable incidents of civil disorder worldwide)

Incidents of unrest and violence in the United States by city